Savage Garden was an Australian rock band.

Savage Garden may also refer to:

 Savage Garden (Savage Garden album), 1997
 Savage Garden (The 69 Eyes album) or the title song, 1995
 The Savage Garden (novel), a 2007 novel by Mark Mills
 The Savage Garden: Cultivating Carnivorous Plants, a 1998 book by Peter D'Amato

See also 
 Godless Savage Garden, a 1998 album by Dimmu Borgir
 Savage Gardens, a minor street in the City of London